Qaleh Bala (also Romanized as Qal‘eh Bālā and Qal‘eh-ye Bālā) is a village in Tarand Rural District, Jalilabad District, Pishva County, Tehran Province, Iran. At the 2006 census, its population was 57, in 11 families.

References 

Populated places in Pishva County